Rumwold (sometimes Rumbold) is an Old English name used to refer to:

Rumwold of Buckingham, infant saint commemorated at Buckingham
Rumbold of Mechelen, saint commemorated at Mechelen

See also
Rumbold (disambiguation)